Rugrats: Time Travelers is a 1999 Game Boy Color game based on the Nickelodeon animated TV show Rugrats. It was developed by Software Creations Limited and released by THQ, Inc.

Summary
The plot involves the Rugrats time-traveling to a goldmine, Ancient Egypt, the Wild West, the sunken city of Atlantis, the prehistoric era, a medieval castle, a fairytale land, a land of pirates, a circus, and outer space. The game starts with Chuckie as the only playable character, in the Toy Palace level. After rescuing Tommy, Phil, Lil, Angelica and Dil in their respective levels, they then become additional playable characters.

Critical reception 

The game was met with very mixed reception, as GameRankings gave it a score of 56%.

IGN gave the game a rating of 3 out of 10 and said, "It's just a frustrating and very, very average game. Kids may like the big graphics in the game, they won't get much gameplay out of it, and they probably will never see some of the funnier scenes. Buy your own rugrat a Rugrats video instead." AllGame gave it two-and-a-half stars out of five, saying, "Rugrats: Time Travelers looks and sounds great, but its gameplay is limited and drearily repetitive. Ultimately, it's yet another mediocre 2D side-scrolling platform game." Pocket Magazine gave it 2 stars out of 5.

References

External links
 

1999 video games
Game Boy Color games
Game Boy Color-only games
Side-scrolling platform games
Rugrats and All Grown Up! video games
Single-player video games
Klasky Csupo video games
Dinosaurs in video games
Video games about time travel
Video games set in prehistory
Video games developed in the United Kingdom
THQ games